Mandy Niklaus (born 1 March 1956) is a fencer who competed for the SC Dynamo Berlin / Sportvereinigung (SV) Dynamo during her career. She won the bronze medal at the world championships by foil (fencing). She competed in the women's individual and team foil events for East Germany at the 1980 Summer Olympics.

References 

1956 births
Living people
German female fencers
Olympic fencers of East Germany
Fencers at the 1980 Summer Olympics
Sportspeople from Dresden
Universiade medalists in fencing
Universiade bronze medalists for East Germany
Medalists at the 1979 Summer Universiade